"W.I.T.C.H." (pronounced "witch") is a 2022 song by Canadian alt-pop singer Devon Cole.

Cole initially performed a demo of the opening verse of the song on TikTok, where it received over 40 million views. She was responding to a piece of instrumental music John Mark Nelson had shared on the platform.

A full version of the song was then released as her first single through Arista Records (who are owned by Sony Music Entertainment) on 7 July 2022. With nearly 300,000 pre-saves, it was Sony's biggest pre-save campaign for a female artist to that point. A music video followed.

"W.I.T.C.H." is an acronym for "Woman in total control of herself". Cole described the song as reclaiming "the witch as a symbol of women's resistance. It celebrates women's strength, autonomy, and rebellion". The song was written by John Mark Nelson, Devon Cole and Alexandra Soumalias, and produced by Nelson. The music was performed by Nelson on keyboards, guitar, bass and drum machine.

Cole received a Juno Award nomination for Breakthrough Artist of the Year at the Juno Awards of 2023.

References

2022 songs
Canadian pop songs